Jhenaidah-1 is a constituency represented in the Jatiya Sangsad (National Parliament) of Bangladesh since 2001 by Abdul Hyee of the Awami League.

Boundaries 
The constituency encompasses Shailkupa Upazila.

History 
The constituency was created in 1984 from a Jessore constituency when the former Jessore District was split into four districts: Jhenaidah, Jessore, Magura, and Narail.

Members of Parliament

Elections

Elections in the 2010s

Elections in the 2000s

Elections in the 1990s

References

External links
 

Parliamentary constituencies in Bangladesh
Jhenaidah District